Inga Kristina Gentzel (later Dahlgren, 24 April 1908 – 1 January 1991) was a Swedish runner, who won a bronze medal in the 800 m at the 1928 Summer Olympics. Shortly before the Olympics she set a new world record in this event, which was broken two weeks later, but remained a national record until 1943. Gentzel won the silver medal in the 1000 m at the 1926 Women's World Games.

Gentzel held Swedish titles in the 200 m in 1929 and in the 800 m in 1928–31. She worked as a piano teacher in Nyköping and often appeared on the Swedish radio as a member of the vocal group Trio Rita, together with Ulla Castegren and Anna-Lisa Cronström. She was a niece of the actor Ludde Gentzel.

References

Further reading 
 

1908 births
1991 deaths
Swedish female middle-distance runners
Athletes (track and field) at the 1928 Summer Olympics
Olympic athletes of Sweden
Olympic bronze medalists for Sweden
Medalists at the 1928 Summer Olympics
Olympic bronze medalists in athletics (track and field)
Women's World Games medalists
Athletes from Stockholm